Etna was a protected cruiser of the Italian Regia Marina (Royal Navy) built in the 1880s. Named for Mount Etna on the island of Sicily, the ship was laid down in January 1883, was launched in September 1885, and was completed in December 1887.

Etna frequently cruised abroad throughout her career, including visits to the United States for the World's Columbian Exposition and the Hudson–Fulton Celebration in 1893 and 1909, respectively. She served as a training ship for naval cadets from 1907. She saw action during the Italo-Turkish War of 1911–1912, primarily providing gunfire support to Italian troops ashore in Libya. By the outbreak of World War I in 1914, Etna had been withdrawn from service and was employed as a headquarters ship for the commander of the Italian fleet at Taranto and later for the light forces based at Brindisi. The old cruiser was finally sold for scrap in May 1921.

Design

The four ships of the Etna class were designed in Italy as domestically produced versions of the British-built cruiser . The Italian government secured a manufacturing license from the British firm Armstrong Whitworth, but the design was revised by the Italian naval engineer Carlo Vigna. These cruisers were intended to serve as "battleship destroyers", and represented a temporary embrace of the  doctrine by the Italian naval command.

Her crew numbered 12 officers and 296 men. The ship had two horizontal compound steam engines, each driving a single propeller, with steam provided by four double-ended cylindrical boilers.

The main armament of the ships consisted of two Armstrong , 30-caliber breech-loading guns mounted in barbettes fore and aft. She was also equipped with a secondary battery of six , 32-caliber, breech-loading guns that were carried in sponsons along the sides of the ship. For anti-torpedo boat defense, Etna was fitted with five  6-pounder Hotchkiss guns and five  1-pounder Hotchkiss guns. Etna was also armed with four  torpedo tubes. One was mounted in the bow underwater and the other three were above water. The conning tower had  worth of armor plating.

From 1905 to 1907 the ship was rebuilt with forecastle and poop decks added and her armament was revised. The heavy 254 mm guns were replaced with two quick-firing (QF)  guns and the six original 152 mm guns were replaced by four QF 152 mm guns, two on each side amidships.

Service history

Etna was built by the Castellammare shipyard; her keel was laid down on 19 January 1883 and her completed hull was launched on 26 September 1885. After fitting-out work was finished, she was commissioned into the Italian fleet on 3 December 1887. Etna served in the Squadra Permamente (Permanent Squadron) from her commissioning to 1893 and then served in North and South American waters until the end of 1895. During this period, Etna and the protected cruisers  and Giovanni Bausan represented Italy at the international naval review in New York, held at the start of the World's Columbian Exposition in Chicago in 1893. The Exposition marked the 400th anniversary of Christopher Columbus's arrival in North America. Contingents from France, Germany, Britain, Spain, and several other nations also participated in the celebration. During the visit, she flew the flag of Rear Admiral G. B. Magnaghi,

During the First Italo-Ethiopian War of 1895–1896 she was stationed in the Red Sea. She thereafter supported Italian interests during the Cretan Revolt of 1898. The ship was then transferred to the Far East, during which time she made a visit to Sydney, Australia. She returned home in 1902 and was disarmed; she was then commissioned as the flagship of the Superior Torpedo-Boat Command in 1904. In 1907, Etna was converted into a training cruiser for naval cadets. Etna visited the United States in September 1909 for the Hudson–Fulton Celebration in New York City, which also included ships from the German, British, and French fleets, among others, in addition to the hosting US Navy. On this occasion, she was joined by the cruiser .

Etna saw limited action during the Italo-Turkish War in 1911–1912. At the outbreak of the war in September 1911, she was stationed in eastern Africa, where Italy had colonies in Eritrea and Somaliland. In December 1911, she was stationed at Tobruk, where she, the battleship , the cruiser Etruria, and twelve torpedo boats provided gunfire support to the Italians defending the city. She remained there through January 1912 while the bulk of the Italian fleet returned to Italy for repairs. In April, Etna bombarded Ottoman positions outside Benghazi, and in August, she sent men ashore at Zuwarah to relieve the garrison there. On 13 September she shelled Ottoman troops near the ruins of ancient Tripoli. The following month, the Ottomans agreed to surrender, ending the war.

In September 1914, Etna was withdrawn from service as a training ship and used instead as a floating headquarters. Italy entered World War I in May 1915 and the ship was thereafter used as a harbor defense ship before returning to her previous role as a headquarters ship for the commander in chief of the Italian fleet at Taranto. By May 1917, she had been transferred to Brindisi, where she served as the headquarters ship for Rear Admiral Alfredo Acton during the Battle of the Strait of Otranto. The old cruiser was sold for scrapping on 15 May 1921, and was the last surviving ship of her class.

Notes

References
 
 
 
 
 
 
 
 
 
 
 
  Via archive.org

External links
 Etna Marina Militare website

1885 ships
Cruisers of Italy
World War I cruisers of Italy
Etna-class protected cruisers
Ships built in Castellammare di Stabia
Cruisers of the Regia Marina